Salmian (also Romanized as Salmīān; also known as Soleymānābād) is a village in Bibi Sakineh Rural District, in the Central District of Malard County, Tehran Province, Iran. At the 2006 census, its population was 136, in 36 families.

References 
1. Hdhub4u

Populated places in Malard County